Luke Mathew Waterfall (born 30 July 1990) is an English professional footballer who plays as a centre-back for  club Grimsby Town.

He has previously played in the English Football League for Scunthorpe United, Mansfield Town, Lincoln City and Shrewsbury Town and at non-league level for Altrincham, Ilkeston Town, Gainsborough Trinity, Macclesfield Town and Wrexham. He was part of the Lincoln team that won the National League and FA Trophy and the Grimsby Town team that was promoted to the EFL via the play-offs in 2022.

Career

Early career
Born in Sheffield, South Yorkshire, Waterfall started his career with Barnsley and was a regular for their youth and reserve teams in the 2007–08 season. After being released, he signed for League One club Tranmere Rovers on 18 July 2008 after a successful trial. He made his debut on 12 August after coming on as a 63rd-minute substitute in a 2–0 defeat away to Grimsby Town in the League Cup. He made his first start on 2 September in a 1–0 victory over Accrington Stanley in the Football League Trophy.

He joined Conference Premier club Altrincham on 14 October 2008 on loan, and made one appearance in the league as a substitute and three cup starts. He was released by Tranmere at the end of 2008–09.

He had unsuccessful trials with Conference Premier clubs Oxford United and York City before signing for Conference North club Ilkeston Town in August 2009 after a successful trial. He finished 2009–10 with 43 appearances and two goals. He signed for Ilkeston's divisional rivals Gainsborough Trinity in May 2010.

Scunthorpe United
Waterfall signed for newly relegated League Two club Scunthorpe United on 4 June 2013 on a one-year contract for an undisclosed fee. On 5 August 2014, he moved to League Two Macclesfield Town on a one-month loan, with manager John Askey requiring him to cover during the search for a new defender, with several trialists failing to be up to his standard. On 7 November, he moved to Mansfield Town on loan until January 2015. He made seven appearances for The Stags before his loan expired.

Wrexham
Waterfall signed for Conference Premier club Wrexham on 15 January 2015 on a one-and-a-half-year contract. Wrexham approached him late into negotiations with two unnamed clubs, causing Waterfall to "make an easy decision" by signing for The Dragons.

Lincoln City
He spent only half a season with Wrexham before signing for their National League rivals Lincoln City on 2 June on a two-year contract. He was appointed club captain. Waterfall made 55 appearances and scored seven goals in 2016–17 as Lincoln were promoted to EFL League Two as National League champions, as well as leading Lincoln to the Quarter finals of the FA Cup by defeating Guiseley, Altrincham, Oldham Athletic, Ipswich Town and Brighton & Hove Albion before defeating Premier League side Burnley. The Imps were eventually beaten 5-0 by Arsenal.

On 5 April 2018, Waterfall as captain lifted the Football League Trophy as The Imps defeated Shrewsbury Town at Wembley Stadium. Several months later Shrewsbury would meet Waterfall's release clause and convince him to sign for the Shropshire side. Waterfall thanked Lincoln fans and called the decision to leave the "toughest decision" of his career, saying a three-year contract and League One football was too good to turn down.

Shrewsbury Town
Waterfall signed for League One club Shrewsbury Town by on 7 August 2018 on a three-year contract for an undisclosed fee. After only one season with The Shrews His contract with the club was terminated by mutual consent on 15 August 2019.

Grimsby Town
The same day, Waterfall signed for League Two club Grimsby Town on a two-year contract.

Ian Holloway was replaced as manager by Paul Hurst who had signed him for Shrewsbury, but neither could prevent Grimsby from being relegated back to the National League at the end of the 2020–21 season.

On 28 May 2022, Waterfall scored twice including a 119th minute winner in extra-time of the semi-final play-off against Wrexham at the Racecourse Ground, helping Grimsby win 5–4 to reach the final. Waterfall captained the Mariners in the 2022 National League play-off Final as Grimsby beat Solihull Moors 2–1 at the London Stadium to return to the Football League.

Waterfall was voted into the National League Team of the Season for the 2021–22 season, alongside team mate John McAtee. On 17 June 2022, Waterfall signed a new two-year contract to keep him at Blundell Park until the summer of 2024.

Career statistics

Honours
Wrexham
FA Trophy runner-up: 2014–15

Lincoln City
National League: 2016–17
EFL Trophy: 2017–18

Grimsby Town
National League play-offs: 2022

Individual
National League Team of the Season: 2021–22

References

External links

Profile at the Grimsby Town F.C. website

1990 births
Living people
Footballers from Sheffield
English footballers
Association football defenders
Barnsley F.C. players
Tranmere Rovers F.C. players
Altrincham F.C. players
Ilkeston Town F.C. (1945) players
Gainsborough Trinity F.C. players
Scunthorpe United F.C. players
Macclesfield Town F.C. players
Mansfield Town F.C. players
Wrexham A.F.C. players
Lincoln City F.C. players
Shrewsbury Town F.C. players
Grimsby Town F.C. players
National League (English football) players
English Football League players